The Judas Code is a 1983 thriller novel by the British writer Derek Lambert. During the Second World War in neutral Lisbon, British intelligence work to try and lure Nazi Germany and the Soviet Union into a vicious attritional war with each other.

References

Bibliography
 Nancy-Stephanie Stone. A Reader's Guide to the Spy and Thriller Novel. G.K. Hall, 1997.

1983 British novels
Novels by Derek Lambert
British thriller novels
Novels set in Lisbon
Novels set in the 1940s
Hamish Hamilton books